The 1906 Hong Kong Sanitary Board election was supposed to be held on 22 January 1906 for the two unofficial seats in the Sanitary Board of Hong Kong.

Only ratepayers who were included in the Special and Common Jury Lists of the years or ratepayers who are exempted from serving on Juries on account of their professional avocations were entitled to vote at the election.

There were only two candidates therefore there was no formal election was held. Henry Humphreys and Augustus Shelton Hooper were elected uncontestedly.

Overview of outcome

References
 Endacott, G. B. Government and people in Hong Kong, 1841-1962 : a constitutional history Hong Kong University Press. (1964) 
 The Hong Kong Government Gazette

1906 elections in Asia
1906 in Hong Kong
Sanitary
Uncontested elections
January 1906 events
1906 elections in the British Empire